Camarasaurus was a genus of quadrupedal, herbivorous dinosaurs and is the most common North American sauropod fossil. Its fossil remains have been found in the Morrison Formation, dating to the Late Jurassic epoch  (Kimmeridgian to Tithonian stages), between 155 and 145 million years ago.

Camarasaurus presented a distinctive cranial profile of a blunt snout and an arched skull that was remarkably square, typical of basal Macronarians.

The name means "chambered lizard", referring to the hollow chambers, known as pleurocoels,  in its cervical vertebrae (Greek  meaning "vaulted chamber", or anything with an arched cover, and  meaning "lizard".

Camarasaurus contains four species that are commonly recognized as valid: Camarasaurus grandis, Camarasaurus lentus, Camarasaurus lewisi, and Camarasaurus supremus. C. supremus, the type species, is the largest and geologically youngest of the four. Camarasaurus is the type genus of Camarasauridae, which also includes its European close relative Lourinhasaurus.

Camarasaurus was named in 1877 by Edward Drinker Cope, during the period of scientific rivalry between him and Othniel Marsh known as the Bone Wars. Soon after, Marsh named a genus Morosaurus, but it was subsequently shown to be synonymous with Camarasaurus.

History

Initial discovery 
The first record of Camarasaurus comes from the spring of 1877 when Mr. Oramel William Lucas of Cañon City, Colorado discovered some large vertebrae at Garden Park, which he sent to Edward Drinker Cope who was based in Philadelphia, Pennsylvania. The original material sent consisted of a partial cervical vertebra, which would become the taxon's namesake, three dorsal vertebrae, and four caudal vertebrae. This specimen is now thought to have been composed of several individuals. From these initial fragmentary remains, Cope made his original description of Camarasaurus supremus (“supreme chambered lizard”) and founded the genus; these remains are now in the American Museum of Natural History under the catalogue number AMNH 560. After receiving the original bones, Cope employed collectors who gathered more of the material which was described in 1921 by Henry Osborn and Charles Mook.

The amount of material was great, it composed of several jumbled partial skeletons. It was not all prepared at once, but a considerable amount of it was cleaned up by Jacob Geismar under Cope's direction throughout the 1870s to 1890s. In 1877 a reconstruction of the skeleton of Camarasaurus was painted by Dr. John Ryder on several canvasses, under the direction of Professor Cope who would use them in lectures to impress his audience. This reconstruction would be the first ever made of a sauropod dinosaur, was natural size and represented the remains of a number of individuals. The reconstruction was over fifty feet in length. Cope's collectors sent in more material from 1877 to 1878, and as Cope would get more material, he would name taxa based on these newly sent remains. Most of these additional taxa are now considered dubious or synonymous with Camarasaurus. By the end of collecting in Garden Park, at least four individuals and several hundred bones had been found from nearly every part of the skeleton.

Como Bluff finds and Morosaurus 
The next Camarasaurus discovery came later in 1877, when a fragmentary posterior skull and a partial postcranial skeleton was discovered and collected in Quarry 1, Como Bluff, Wyoming by crews working for Othniel Charles Marsh. This skeleton would be the best preserved single individual of Camarasaurus at the time, and it was named as a new species of Apatosaurus in 1877. The specimen was not fully collected until 1879 and the specimen contains the majority of a juvenile's skeleton (holotype YPM 1901) Meanwhile, crews working for Edward Cope in Garden Park, collected a fragmentary specimen consisting of a femur and 2 caudal vertebrae was made a new species of Amphicoelias by Cope which he named Amphicoelias latus in 1877. This species was tentatively synonymized with C. supremus in 1921. In 1998, Kenneth Carpenter argued that the stratigraphic position of the find suggested it was more likely to be synonymous with C. grandis, but in a 2005 study of the biostratigraphic distribution of Camarasaurus, Takehito Ikejiri retained it in synonymy with C. supremus. In 1878, a sauropod sacrum was discovered with several other jumbled sauropod postcranial elements, again at Como Bluff. The remains were also sent to Marsh and in 1878 the sacrum was assigned to a new genus and species, Morosaurus impar ("unpaired stupid lizard"). Morosaurus would receive several new species throughout the late 19th century, even becoming part of a new family in 1892, the Morosauridae. A majority of Morosaurus species are now considered dubious, including the type species, or reclassified. In 1889, a new species of Morosaurus was named based on a partial skull and skeleton from Como Bluff. Morosaurus lentus was the name given to the skeleton (holotype YPM 1910) and the skeleton was mounted in the Yale Peabody Museum fossil hall in 1930.

Second Dinosaur Rush finds 

In the late 1890s, the American Museum of Natural History and the Field Museum found additional Morosaurus material at Como Bluff and Fruita respectively. Mostly consisting of limb material, the new Morosaurus material led to new reconstructions of Sauropod manus and pes structure. The AMNH made an important discovery in 1899 at their Bone Cabin Quarry in Wyoming with the discovery of the first complete Camarasaurus skull and mandible with associated cervical vertebrae. Major reassessment of Morosaurus and Camarasaurus came in 1901, a reassessment by Elmer Riggs concluded that of the five Morosaurus species named by Marsh, only three were valid. Morosaurus grandis, Morosaurus lentus, and Morosaurus agilis (now known as Smitanosaurus) were accepted as valid, with Morosaurus impar synonymous with M. grandis. Possible synonymy between Morosaurus and Camarasaurus was also suggested by Riggs. In 1905, the first mounted skeleton of a sauropod was mounted at the AMNH of a Brontosaurus, the skull of the mount was notoriously based on material that was likely from a Camarasaurus from Como Bluff.

The Carnegie Museum had an important Camarasaurus discovery in 1909 of a nearly complete skeleton of a juvenile, now under specimen number CM 11338. The specimen was notably found articulated in a death pose and is prominently displayed at the Carnegie Museum hall. Earl Douglass discovered the specimen and it was collected from 1909 to 1910 by Carnegie Museum crew working at Dinosaur National Monument. This skeleton was not described until 1925 by Charles W. Gilmore This specimen was referred to Camarasaurus lentus. The skeleton is one of the best Sauropod specimens known, with almost every element preserved in articulation including the fragile cervical vertebrae.

Another Camarasaurus skeleton was found in 1918, again at Dinosaur National Monument by Carnegie crews, this specimen can be viewed at the National Museum of Natural History. The specimen, known as USNM V 13786, was traded to the USNM in 1935 and prep work started on the specimen in 1936 at the Texas Centennial Exposition in Dallas where it could be viewed by visitors of the event. Preparation work would continue until 1947 when the skeleton was mounted in a death pose in the fossil hall. The USNM's Camarasaurus was also referred to C. lentus.

In 1919, W. J. Holland would name Uintasaurus douglassi based another sauropod specimen from DNM that was discovered by the Carnegie Museum in 1909. The type specimen was incomplete, consisting of 5 anterior cervical vertebrae, and is a synonym of Camarasaurus lentus. Additional Camarasaurus material was found at near Black Mesa in western Oklahoma during the 1940s and has been referred to Camarasaurus supremus, the material consists of many large vertebrae and some skull elements.

Resurgent discoveries 

No major discoveries would come for Camarasaurus until in 1967, James Jensen collected a well preserved and articulated partial postcranial skeleton, including majority of the vertebral column, at Uncompahgre Hill in western Colorado and was deposited at Brigham Young University under specimen number BYU 9740. The skeleton wasn't full prepared until years later, and was described in 1988 as a new genus and species of Camarasaurid, Cathetosaurus lewisi. C. lewisis original description was brief, but later in 1996 the skeleton was given a full osteology and placed as a species of Camarasaurus by John McIntosh and colleagues. In their paper, they determined that C. supremus, C. grandis, C. lentus, and C. lewisi were valid. In 2013, Octavio Mateus and Emanuel Tschopp argued that C. lewisi was actually its own genus based on a specimen found at Howe Quarry in 1992 that they referred to the species. Further research by Tschopp concluded that the Howe Quarry specimen was most likely to represent Camarasaurus after all. As of 2019, most researchers considered C. lewisi to be a species of Camarasaurus.

In 1992, another substantial and articulated skeleton of Camarasaurus was collected, this skeleton by Jeffrie Parker and colleagues near the AMNH's Bone Cabin Quarry at Como Bluff. This skeleton was referred to Camarasaurus grandis and is one of the most complete specimens assigned to the species, it now resides at the Gunma Museum of Natural History in Tokyo under specimen number GMNH-PV 101. 1992 saw yet another Camarasaurus skeleton discovery further north at Howe Quarry, Wyoming by crews working for the Sauriermuseum Aathal in Switzerland. The skeleton is one of the best known, with nearly every element articulated and skin impressions from the skull and hindlimb. The specimen, SMA 002, has not yet gotten a full identification, but has been suggested to be a specimen of C. lewisi. In 1996, several fragmentary remains of Camarasaurus were described from western South Dakota and New Mexico, extending the northeastern and southern range of the genus, with the New Mexican remains from the Summerville Formation. The northernmost specimen of Camarasaurus was discovered in 2005 in the Snowy Mountains region of central Montana and consists of a nearly complete skull and several postcranial elements.

Fossil record

Camarasaurus fossils are very common. Over 500 specimens are known, including many isolated bones and about 50 partial skeletons. It is found in a wide area over the western United States, from as far north as Montana to as far south as New Mexico, in rocks of the Morrison Formation. Due to this abundance, Camarasaurus is a very well-known sauropod. A juvenile specimen of Camarasaurus, CM 11338, is the most complete sauropod skeleton ever discovered. Numerous skulls are known. Even though complete necks are rarely found in sauropods, five specimens of Camarasaurus preserve all or nearly all of the cervical vertebrae. Most identifiable specimens of Camarasaurus belong to one of two species, C. grandis and C. lentus; C. lewisi and C. supremus are rarer.

Description 

Camarasaurus is among the most common and frequently well-preserved sauropod dinosaurs uncovered and has been well described in numerous publications. Similar to other Macronarians, it had the typical large naris, long forelimbs, and short tail compared to the contemporary Diplodocids. Camarasaurus was a medium-sized sauropod compared to contemporary species in the same formation, but in the Tithonian reached large sizes with C. supremus. The maximum size of the most common species, C. lentus, was about 15 m (49 ft) in length. The largest species, C. supremus, reached a maximum length of 23 m (75 ft) and, a maximum estimated weight of 47 metric tons (51.8 tons).

The arched skull of Camarasaurus was remarkably square and the blunt snout had many fenestrae. The robust skull of Camarasaurus preserves much better than many other sauropods, unlike the gracile skulls that Diplodocids that are also found in the Morrison Formation. The 19-cm-long (7.5-in) teeth were shaped like chisels (spatulate) and arranged evenly along the jaw. The strength of the teeth indicates that Camarasaurus probably ate coarser plant material than the slender-toothed diplodocids.

A specimen of Camarasaurus called SMA 0002 (which has also been assigned to Cathetosaurus) from Wyoming's Howe-Stephens Quarry, referred to as "E.T.", shows evidence of soft tissue. Along the jaw line, ossified remains of what appear to have been the animal's gums have been recovered, indicating that it had deep-set teeth covered by gums, with only the tips of the crowns protruding. The teeth were, upon death, pushed further out from their sockets as the gums retracted, dried, and tightened through decay. The examinations of the specimen also indicate that the teeth were covered by tough outer scales and possibly a beak of some variety, though this is not known for certain.

The neck of Camarasaurus was of only moderate length by sauropod standards. It was composed of 12 vertebrae. Most of the cervical neural spines were bifurcated, with more vertebrae developing bifurcated neural spines as the animal grew. As in other sauropods, the vertebrae of the neck and torso contained chambers that in life were filled by air sacs connected to the respiratory system. The air sacs could take up more than half of the space inside the vertebrae, making them as highly pneumatic as the bones of birds. It is these chambers that give Camarasaurus its name, "chambered lizard".

The tail of Camarasaurus was composed of 53 vertebrae.

Classification and species
Camarasaurus is the type genus of the family Camarasauridae, members of which are medium-sized Macronarian sauropods that mostly date to the Late Jurassic. Camarasaurids had shorter forelimbs than hindlimbs, large scapulocoracoids, and longer tails than necks. When Edward Cope described Camarasaurus in 1877, he believed it was a dinosaur closely related to Cetiosaurus, Bothriospondylus, Ornithopsis, Anchisaurus (Megadactylus), and Pneumatosteus, but didn’t name a group for these taxa until the description of Amphicoelias when he erected Camarasauridae. Camarasaurus is the only taxon uncontroversially regarded as a valid genus of camarasaurid. It contains four species: C. grandis, C. lentus, C. lewisi, and C. supremus. C. lewisi may represent a distinct genus, Cathetosaurus. Lourinhasaurus, the type species of which was formerly assigned to Camarasaurus, is regarded as a camarasaurid by most studies, though it has also been considered to be a basal eusauropod.

A simplified cladogram of basal Macronaria after Tan et al (2020) is shown below:

Camarasaurus is considered to be a basal macronarian, more closely related to the common ancestor of all macronarians than to more derived forms like Brachiosaurus.

Species 
Camarasaurus is regarded as containing four valid species by most researchers: C. grandis, C. lentus, C. lewisi, and C. supremus. C. supremus, the species named by Cope in 1877, is the type species. C. grandis was named in 1877 and C. lentus in 1889. The fourth species, C. lewisi, is of uncertain affinities. It was originally described as a distinct genus, Cathetosaurus, in 1988, but reclassified as a species of Camarasaurus in 1996. Some researchers have suggested that Cathetosaurus should be reinstated as a distinct genus, whereas others have suggested that C. lewisi may be synonymous with another Camarasaurus species.

C. supremus, as its name suggests, is the largest known species of Camarasaurus and one of the most massive sauropods known from the late Jurassic Morrison Formation. Except for its huge size, it was nearly indistinguishable from C. lentus. C. supremus was not typical of the genus as a whole, and is known only from the latest, uppermost parts of the formation and is extremely uncommon. Both C. grandis, C. lentus, and C. lewisi were smaller, as well as occurring in the earlier stages of the Morrison.

Stratigraphic evidence suggests that chronological sequence aligned with the physical differences between the three species, and it describes an evolutionary progression within the Morrison Formation. C. grandis is the oldest species and occurred in the lowest rock layers of the Morrison. C. lewisi only briefly coexisted with C. grandis in the lowest strata of the upper Morrison until going extinct, but it is possible this is because of a lack of specimens from C. lewisi. C. lentus appeared later, co-existing with C. grandis for several million years, possibly due to different ecological niches as suggested by differences in the spinal anatomy of the two species. At a later stage, C. grandis disappeared from the rock record, leaving only C. lentus. Then C. lentus, too, disappeared; at the same time, C. supremus appeared in the uppermost layers. This immediate succession of species, as well as the very close similarity between the two, suggests that C. supremus may have evolved directly from C. lentus, representing a larger, later-surviving population of animals.

Synonyms and dubious species 

 Amphicoelias latus was named by Edward Cope in 1877 based on a right femur and 4 caudal vertebrae found at Garden Park and is synonymous with either C. supremus or C. grandis.
 Caulodon diversidens was also named by Cope in 1877 on, now dubious, teeth that can only be placed as a Macronarian or as synonymous with Camarasaurus supremus.
 Caulodon leptoganus was named in 1878 by Cope on 2 partial teeth and is also considered to be unclassifiable beyond Macronaria or as synonymous with Camarasaurus supremus.
 Morosaurus impar was named by Marsh in 1878 as the type species of Morosaurus, and the material consisted only of a sacrum and possibly additional postcranial material found at Como Bluff. It is now considered a synonym of C. grandis.
 Morosaurus robustus was named on the basis of an ilium by Marsh in 1878 collected at Como Bluff. It is now considered a synonym of C. grandis.
 Camarasaurus leptodirus was another one of Cope's Garden Park sauropods and was named in 1879 on 3 partial cervical vertebrae, it has been suggested to be a synonym of C. supremus.
Diplodocus lacustris was named by Othniel Marsh in 1884 on the basis of several teeth, a premaxilla, and a maxilla from Morrison, Colorado that were collected by Arthur Lakes and Benjamin Mudge in 1877. Although the teeth and dentary of D. lacustris are Flagellicaudatan, the skull material is likely that of a Camarasaurus.
 Pleurocoelus montanus was also named by Marsh in 1896 as a new species of Pleurocoelus, the material consisting of several vertebral centra and assorted postcrania of a juvenile individual from Como Bluff. It is generally regarded as a synonym of C. grandis.
Uintasaurus douglassi was named in 1919 by W. J. Holland for 5 anterior cervical vertebrae from Dinosaur National Monument, the species was later regarded as a synonym of Camarasaurus lentus.
Camarasaurus annae was named by Tage Ellinger based on an anterior dorsal vertebra in 1950. This species is generally considered a synonym of C.lentus.

Reassigned species 

 Morosaurus agilis was named in 1889 by Marsh based on a partial skull and 3 vertebrae from Garden Park, Colorado. The species remained in taxonomic uncertainty until in 2020, it was placed in a new genus, Smitanosaurus, and reclassified as a dicraeosaurid.
 Camarasaurus becklesiii was described as Pelorosaurus becklesii in 1842 by Gideon Mantell based on a partial forelimb from Sussex, United Kingdom. It was placed in Morosaurus by Marsh in 1889 and Camarasaurus by von Huene in 1932 until in 2015, it was placed in its own genus, Haestasaurus.
 Morosaurus marchei was named by Sauvage in 1898 based on an incomplete distal caudal vertebra and tooth from the Upper Jurassic strata of the Alcobaca Formation of Portugal. Lapparent & Zbyszewski referred the holotype vertebra to Megalosaurus insignis and Madsen et al., 1995 referred it to Megalosauria. The referred tooth was identified as belonging to Turiasauria in 2017.
 Camarasaurus alenquerensis was named as a species of Apatosaurus in 1957 by Albert-Félix de Lapparent and Georges Zbyweski on a partial postcranial skeleton from Lourinha, Portugal. It was placed in Camarasaurus by John McIntosh in 1990, but was granted a new genus in 1998, Lourinhasaurus.

Paleobiology

Feeding

Previously, scientists have suggested that Camarasaurus and other sauropods may have swallowed gastroliths (stones) to help grind the food in the stomach, regurgitating or passing them when they became too smooth. More recent analysis, however, of the evidence for stomach stones suggests this was not the case. The strong, robust teeth of Camarasaurus were more developed than those of most sauropods and were replaced on average every 62 days (M. D'Emic et al.), indicating that Camarasaurus may have masticated food in its mouth to some degree before swallowing. Other findings indicate that Camarasaurus spp. preferred  vegetation different from other sauropods, allowing them to share the same environment without competing.

Growth
Long-bone histology enables researchers to estimate the age that a specific individual reached. A study by Griebeler et al. (2013) examined long-bone histological data and concluded that the Camarasaurus sp.

Metabolism
Eagle et al. performed clumped isotope thermometry on the enamel covering the teeth of various Jurassic sauropods, including Camarasaurus.

Paleopathology

A Camarasaurus pelvis recovered from Dinosaur National Monument in Utah shows gouging attributed to Allosaurus and on the ilium of the C. lewisi holotype there are large Theropod bite marks.

In 1992, a partial C. grandis skeleton was discovered at the Bryan Small Stegosaurus Quarry of the Morrison Formation near Canon City, Colorado.  This specimen preserved a partial right humerus cataloged as DMNH 2908 and associated vertebrae from the back and tail. In 2001, Lorie McWhinney, Kenneth Carpenter, and Bruce Rothschild published a description of a pathology observed on the humerus.
 They noted a juxtacortical lesion 25 by 18 cm wide made of bone that resembled woven fibers. Although woven bone forms in accessory dental bone, in other locations, it is a sign of injury or illness. The woven bone's "undulating fibrous bundles" were observed oriented in the direction of the m. brachialis. The lesion's fusion and lack of porosity at its near and far ends indicate the periostitis was inactive or healed. McWhinney and the other researchers argued that this injury would have been a continuous source of hardship for the animal. It would have exerted pressure on the muscles. This pressure would have compressed the muscles' blood vessels and nerves, reducing the range of motion of both the limb's flexor and extensor muscles. This effect would have hindered the M. brachialis, m. brachoradialis, and to a lesser degree the m. biceps brachii to the lesion's position on the humerus. The researchers inferred that the inflammation of the muscles and periosteum would have caused additional complications in the lower region of the fore limb, as well. The lesion would also have caused long-term fasciitis and myosistis. The cumulative effect of these pathological processes would have moderate to severe effects on the ability of the limb to move and "made everyday activities such as foraging for food and escaping predators harder to accomplish." To help determine the cause of the pathology, McWhinney and the other researchers performed a CT scan in 3-mm increments. The CT scan found that the mass had a consistent radiodensity and was separated from the cortex of the bone by a radiolucent line. No evidence was found of stress fracture or infectious processes like osteomyelitis or infectious periostitis. They also ruled out osteochondroma because the axis of the spur is 25° relative to the vertical axis of the humerus, whereas an osteochondroma would have formed at 90° to the axis of the humerus. Other candidates identified by the scientists for the origin of the spur-bearing lesion included:

 Hypertrophic osteoarthropathy – although this was ruled out by the presence of the spur-like process
 Osteoid osteoma – but this would not explain the spur or osteoblastic reaction
 Shin splints or tibial stress syndrome – a possible origin, as many symptoms would be held in common, but shin splints would not explain the spur.
 Myositis ossificans traumatica (circumscripta) – Possible, but unlikely source.
 Avulsion injury – McWhinney and the other researchers considered an avulsion injury caused by "repetitive overexertion of the muscles" to be the most likely source for the lesion on the humerus. The researchers believed the lesion to have originated with the avulsion of the m. brachialis causing the formation of "a downward-sloping elliptical mass". The bone spur was caused by an osteoblastic response following a tear at the base of the m. brachioradialis caused by its flexor motion.

Paleoecology

Habitat

The Morrison Formation, situated along the eastern flank of the Rocky Mountains, is home to a fossil-rich stretch of Late Jurassic rock. A large number of dinosaur species can be found here, including relatives of Camarasaurus such as Diplodocus, Apatosaurus, and Brachiosaurus, but camarasaurs are the most abundant of the dinosaurs in the formation. Camarasaurus fossils have been found in almost every major locality and have one of the greatest known distributions of Morrison dinosaurs, with fossils found in localities from New Mexico to Montana and Utah to Oklahoma.  According to radiometric dating, the Morrison sedimentary layers range between 156.3 million years ago (Mya) at the base, to 146.8 Mya at the top, which places it in the late Oxfordian, Kimmeridgian, and early Tithonian stages of the Late Jurassic period. Its environment is interpreted as semiarid with distinct wet and dry seasons.

Dinosaur and trace fossils are found particularly in the Morrison Basin, which stretches from New Mexico to Alberta and Saskatchewan and was formed when the precursors to the Front Range of the Rocky Mountains started pushing up to the west. Eroded material from their east-facing drainage basins was carried by streams and rivers and deposited in swampy lowlands, lakes, river channels, and floodplains. The formation is similar in age to the Lourinha Formation in Portugal and the Cañadón Calcáreo Formation in Argentina, Camarasaurid fossils have been found at the 2 formations. In 1877, it became the center of the Bone Wars, a fossil-collecting rivalry between early paleontologists Othniel Charles Marsh and Edward Drinker Cope, with Camarasaurus itself being discovered and named by the latter Paleontologist during the conflict.

Paleofauna
The Morrison Formation records an environment and time dominated by gigantic sauropod dinosaurs such as Maraapunisaurus, Amphicoelias, Barosaurus, Diplodocus, Apatosaurus, Brontosaurus, and Brachiosaurus. Dinosaurs living alongside Camarasaurus included the herbivorous ornithischians Camptosaurus, Gargoyleosaurus, Dryosaurus, Stegosaurus, and Nanosaurus. Predators in this paleoenvironment included the theropods Saurophaganax, Torvosaurus, Ceratosaurus, Marshosaurus, Stokesosaurus, Ornitholestes, and Allosaurus, which accounted for up to 75% of theropod specimens, and was at the top trophic level of the Morrison food web. Camarasaurus is commonly found at the same sites as Allosaurus, Apatosaurus, Stegosaurus, and Diplodocus.

Other organisms in this region included bivalves, snails, ray-finned fishes, frogs, salamanders, turtles, sphenodonts, lizards, terrestrial and aquatic crocodylomorphs, and several species of pterosaurs such as Harpactognathus and Mesadactylus. Early mammals present were docodonts (such as Docodon), multituberculates, symmetrodonts, and triconodonts. The flora of the period has been revealed by fossils of green algae, fungi, mosses, horsetails, cycads, ginkgoes, and several families of conifers. Vegetation varied from river-lining forests of tree ferns, and ferns (gallery forests), to fern savannas with occasional trees such as the Araucaria-like conifer Brachyphyllum.

References

Works cited

 

 

 
 
 
 
 
 
 
 
 

Late Jurassic dinosaurs of North America
Macronarians
Dinosaurs of the Morrison Formation
Fossil taxa described in 1877
Taxa named by Edward Drinker Cope
Paleontology in Colorado
Paleontology in Utah